Man in Motion is the fifth studio album by Night Ranger, released in 1988. This album was the first studio album recorded by Night Ranger after the departure of keyboardist Alan Fitzgerald, who was replaced by Jesse Bradman.

Background
"Man in Motion" saw a change in the musical direction of the band, focusing on a more guitar driven sound. Unfortunately the change in direction did not result in much radio play and the album became the first Night Ranger album to fail to achieve gold or platinum status

Bassist and singer Jack Blades would leave the band in 1989 to form rock super group Damn Yankees with Tommy Shaw of Styx and Ted Nugent. Jeff Watson also left to join the band Mother's Army. Jack Blades discussed why he left Night Ranger, stating that the members of the band were going in different directions, with everyone writing separate songs and their egos clashing.

The band would not release another album until 1995's album Feeding Off the Mojo, which featured Gary Moon of Three Dog Night on bass and vocals. Jack Blades, Jeff Watson, and Alan Fitzgerald all returned to the band for 1997's album Neverland.

Reception

"Man in Motion" received mixed reviews and its singles were unable to gain much recognition. The first single off the album was "I Did It for Love", which topped out on the Billboard Top 100 at 75. The second single "Reason to Be" reached position 48 in 1989 on the Billboard Mainstream Rock Airplay chart. The third single, "Don't Start Thinking (I'm Alone Tonight)", failed to chart at all.

Track listing
All credits adapted from the original release.

Personnel
Night Ranger
Jack Blades – bass, lead and backing vocals
Brad Gillis – lead and rhythm guitars, backing vocals
Jeff Watson – lead and rhythm guitars
Kelly Keagy – drums, lead and backing vocals, percussion

Additional musicians
Jesse Bradman – keyboards, backing vocals
Alan Pasqua, Claude Gaudette, Eric Persing – additional keyboards
Joyce Imbesi – keyboards on track 5
John Purdell – additional keyboards, additional backing vocals
Kevin Chalfant – additional backing vocals
Mark Newman – computer programming

Production
Keith Olsen – producer, engineer and mixing on tracks 1 to 4, 6 to 9, 11
Brian Foraker – producer, engineer and mixing on tracks 5 and 10
Jimmy Reitizel – additional arrangements on track 5
John Hanlon, Mark Segal – engineers
Ron Da Silva, Squeak Stone – assistant engineers on tracks 5 and 10
Greg Fulginiti – mastering at Artisan Sound Recorders, Hollywood, California
David Cole – executive producer on track 5 and 10
Hugh Syme – art direction, design

Charts

Album

Singles

References 

Night Ranger albums
1988 albums
Albums produced by Keith Olsen
MCA Records albums
Glam metal albums